Graham Bryan Murray (born 3 October 1976) is a New Zealand cricketer. He played in three first-class and three List A matches for Wellington in 2004 and 2005.

References

External links
 
 

1976 births
Living people
New Zealand cricketers
Wellington cricketers
Cricketers from Wellington City